Charles de Wolff (19 June 1932 – 23 November 2011) was a Dutch organist and conductor. He conducted the Netherlands Bach Society from 1965 until 1983. After 1983 he worked with the Bachkoor Holland.

References 

1932 births
2011 deaths
Dutch conductors (music)
Male conductors (music)
Dutch classical organists
Male classical organists
People from Stadskanaal
Recipients of the Gaudeamus International Interpreters Award